Line 2 of CRT runs southeastward from  to . Line 2 began operation as the first metro line in the West of China on 18 June 2005. The line was China's first heavy monorail line, built using Japan's ODA and Hitachi Monorail technology.

Line 2, which currently runs  and services 25 stations, begins as a subway under downtown Jiefangbei, then runs west along the southern bank of the Jialing River on an elevated line, and then turns south into the city's southwestern inner suburbs, looping back east to terminate at Yudong in Ba'nan.

Opening timeline

Service routes 
  –  (8 car route)
  –

Current Stations

References 

 
Railway lines opened in 2005
2005 establishments in China
Monorails
Monorails in China